Ghiyasuddin Mahmud Shah was the last Sultan of the Hussain Shahi dynasty of the Bengal Sultanate, reigning from 1533 to 1538 CE. The dynasty was founded by his father, Alauddin Husain Shah, in 1494.

History
Banglapedia assesses him as a "weak, pleasure loving and easy-going ruler" who "...had neither diplomatic foresight, nor any practical approach to the political problems which beset Bengal during his reign." His reign was marked by rebellions, including those by Khuda Bakhsh Khan, his general and governor of Chittagong, and Makhdum Alam, the governor of Hajipur.

During his reign the Portuguese arrived in Chittagong in 1534, and were captured and sent to Gaur as prisoners on charges of mischief. But, in the face of enemy superiority he reconciled with them and permitted them to establish factories and commercial stations at Chittagong and Hughli. Later, with the help of the Portuguese, the Sultan held the Teliagarhi pass (1536 AD) avoiding the invasion.  Ghiyasuddin Mahmud Shah and his Portuguese allies were defeated by Sher Shah Suri on 6 April 1538, as his appeals to the Mughal Emperor Humayun went unanswered.

See also
 List of rulers of Bengal
 History of Bengal
 History of Bangladesh
 History of India

References

1538 deaths
1533 in India
Year of birth unknown
16th-century Indian monarchs
Hussain Shahi dynasty